Eduardo Rafael Jiménez (born April 4, 1995) is a Venezuelan former professional baseball pitcher. He has played in Major League Baseball (MLB) for the Detroit Tigers.

Career

Detroit Tigers
Jiménez signed with the Detroit Tigers as an intentional free agent in July 2011. He made his professional debut in 2012 with the Venezuelan Summer League Tigers, going 0–5 with a 3.61 ERA in 42.1 innings. He returned to the VSL Tigers in 2013, going 4–2 with a 3.21 ERA in 61.2 innings. He underwent Tommy John surgery and missed the 2014 season. In 2015 after finishing his rehab, he appeared in 4 games for the Gulf Coast Tigers, pitching 5 scoreless innings. He played for the Connecticut Tigers in 2016, going 0–0 with a 2.70 ERA in 13 innings. He split the 2017 season between the West Michigan Whitecaps and the Lakeland Flying Tigers, combining to go 1–2 with a 2.13 ERA in 50.2 innings. While with West Michigan that season, he was suspended 30 game for his actions during an on-field brawl where he threw a baseball at opposing players, striking one player in the leg. He returned to Lakeland and spent the 2018 season there, going 3–4 with a 3.42 ERA in 50 innings. He played for the Mesa Solar Sox of the Arizona Fall League during the 2018 offseason.  

The Tigers added him to their 40-man roster after the 2017 season. He began the 2019 season playing for the Erie SeaWolves and the Toledo Mud Hens. On May 5, the Detroit Tigers called up Jiménez to replace Drew VerHagen, who was designated for assignment. He made his major league debut on May 7, pitching a scoreless inning in relief. He was sent back down to Toledo three days later. Jiménez was outrighted off the Tigers roster on October 23, 2019. He became a minor league free agent on November 7, 2019.

Arizona Diamondbacks
On December 12, 2019, Jiménez signed a minor league deal with the Arizona Diamondbacks. He became a free agent on November 2, 2020.

References

External links

1995 births
Living people
Connecticut Tigers players
Detroit Tigers players
Erie SeaWolves players
Gulf Coast Tigers players
Lakeland Flying Tigers players
Major League Baseball pitchers
Major League Baseball players from Venezuela
Mesa Solar Sox players	
People from Cumaná
Toledo Mud Hens players
Venezuelan expatriate baseball players in the United States
Venezuelan Summer League Tigers players
West Michigan Whitecaps players